Eugene Chiaberge (9 April 1886 – 21 May 1936) was a French racing cyclist. He rode in the 1925 Tour de France.

References

1886 births
1936 deaths
French male cyclists
Place of birth missing